"Take the Money and Run" is a song recorded in 1976 by the Steve Miller Band. A song about two young (possibly teenage) bandits and the detective pursuing them, it was one of the many hit singles produced by the Steve Miller Band in the 1970s and featured on the 1976 album Fly Like an Eagle. The song peaked at number 11 on the U.S. Billboard Hot 100 in July 1976 and also charted in Australia.

Background and writing 
The song was written as a road trip. Miller drew inspiration from his childhood, when he listened to the radio station while on long road trips with his family and he would sing along to his favorite songs. Because FM radio was capable of clearer stereo sound, this allowed him to make his road trip songs with more layers for a much bigger sound.

Reception
Cash Box said that the song gets off to a "fine start" with  "spirited drums" and has "intelligent" lyrics and music that is "just as good, maybe better, than "Space Cowboy." Record World said that this "story about an armed robbery is punctuated with some good guitar chording and [Miller's] distinct vocal."

Personnel
Steve Miller – guitar, double-tracked lead vocals
Gary Mallaber – drums, percussion
Lonnie Turner – bass guitar

Legacy
This was the first song Miller let a rap group sample, since he had previously turned down requests to sample his songs. Run-D.M.C. used it in 2001 with Everlast also on vocals. He agreed only after hearing the song and liking what they did with it.

In 2000, the song was covered in country style by Canadian singer Julian Austin on his album Back in Your Life.

In 2006, the 30th Anniversary Edition of the Fly Like An Eagle album was released. The track "Take The Joker And Run," was included as a bonus track and is an acoustic version of "Take the Money and Run" sung over an early version of "The Joker."

References

Steve Miller Band songs
Julian Austin (musician) songs
Songs written by Steve Miller (musician)
Song recordings produced by Steve Miller
Capitol Records singles
1976 singles
1976 songs